Blackwood is an unincorporated community and coal town located in Wise County, Virginia, United States. The community is encountered along US Route 23 Business Route between Big Stone Gap and Norton.

References

Unincorporated communities in Wise County, Virginia
Unincorporated communities in Virginia
Coal towns in Virginia